Rou may refer to:
 Rapid Offensive Unit, a class of fictional artificially intelligent starship in The Culture universe of late Scottish author Iain Banks
 Romania, 3-letter ISO country code (derived from the French name of the country: Roumanie)
 Aleksandr Rou, Soviet film director
 Air Canada Rouge, ICAO code
 Oriental Republic of Uruguay (República Oriental del Uruguay, ROU, also license plate code)